Emma Harrison may refer to:
 Emma Harrison (actress)
 Emma Harrison (entrepreneur)